Canarium erythrinum is a species of sea snail, a marine gastropod mollusk in the family Strombidae, the true conchs.

Canarium erythrinum  is widespread throughout the tropical waters of the Indo/West Pacific area, including the Red Sea.

This sea shell has size going from 2 cm to 5 cm.

References

External links
http://www.marinespecies.org/aphia.php?p=taxdetails&id=532157

Strombidae
Gastropods described in 1817